Joanna Wyatt may refer to:

Jo Wyatt, voice actress
Joanna Wyatt, character in Visions of Joanna played by Geneva Carr